Tremain Shayn Paul (born 12 August 1991) is a Saint Lucian international footballer who plays as a midfielder for Williams Connection.

Career
He made his international debut for Saint Lucia in 2011, and has appeared in FIFA World Cup qualifying matches.

International Goals
Scores and results list Saint Lucia's goal tally first.

References

1991 births
Living people
Saint Lucian footballers
Saint Lucia international footballers
People from Micoud Quarter
Expatriate footballers in Trinidad and Tobago
TT Pro League players
W Connection F.C. players
Association football midfielders